Francis James Pope (1884–1953) was an English footballer who played in the Football League for Notts County and Wolverhampton Wanderers.

References

1884 births
1953 deaths
English footballers
Association football forwards
English Football League players
Cradley Heath F.C. players
Wolverhampton Wanderers F.C. players
Stourbridge F.C. players
Notts County F.C. players
Walsall F.C. players